Tibetan Government may refer to:

Currently governing Tibet:
 Government of Tibet Autonomous Region, an autonomous region in the People's Republic of China

In exile:
 Central Tibetan Administration, commonly known as the Tibetan Government-in-exile, headed by the 14th Dalai Lama and Prime Minister Lobsang Sangay

Historically:
 Ganden Phodrang, the government in Tibet from 1642 until the 1950s under the leadership of the Dalai Lamas or regent, or the Kashag, the governing council.
 Any of the various other regimes which were dominant in Tibet prior to 1642, beginning with the Tibetan Empire.